Patricio Damián Guillén Gandini (born 28 December 1984 in Montevideo) is an Uruguayan footballer who plays as a goalkeeper for Spanish club SD Compostela.

Career statistics

Club

References

External links

1984 births
Living people
Uruguayan people of Spanish descent
Uruguayan footballers
Association football goalkeepers
Club Atlético River Plate (Montevideo) players
C.A. Cerro players
Racing Club de Montevideo players
Segunda División B players
Tercera División players
CD Ourense footballers
Barakaldo CF footballers
SD Compostela footballers
Uruguayan expatriate footballers
Uruguayan expatriate sportspeople in Spain
Expatriate footballers in Spain
CD Binéfar players
Atlético Monzón players